Vasantha (pronounced vasantā) is a raga in Carnatic music (musical scale of South Indian classical music). It is a janya raga of Suryakantam, the 17th Melakarta raga. According to P|Subba Rao, majority opinion is that the raga is derived from Mayamalavagowla, the 15th Melakarta raga.

Vasantha is suitable to be sung in evening and is considered an auspicious raga.

Structure 
Vasantha is an asymmetric scale that does not contain panchamam. It is called a vakra audava-shadava raga, malathiga structure is as follows (see swaras in Carnatic music for details on below notation and terms):

ārohaṇa : 
avarohaṇa : 

This scale uses the notes shadjam, shuddha rishabham, antara gandharam, shuddha madhyamam, chathusruthi dhaivatham and kakali nishadam.

Popular compositions 
Vasantha has ample scope for alapana. This scale has been used by many composers for compositions in classical music. Here are some popular compositions in Vasantha.

Ninne kori, a popular varnam by Tecchur Singarachari
Sitamma Mayamma by Tyagaraja
Brihadambikayai and Ramachandram Bhavayami  by Muthuswami Dikshitar
Paramapurusha Jagadeesha by Swathi Thirunal
Malmaruga Shanmukha by Papanasam Sivan
Natanam Adinar by Gopalakrishna Bharathi'
Rajeswarim Sambhavaye by Ganapathi Sachchidananda Swamiji
Thom Thomena and Yoganrusimha Padâmbuja Brunga by Kalyani Varadarajan
Kodu bega Divyamathi by Purandara dasa
Palisenna Gopalakrishna By Jagannatha Dasa
Maadhayai nidhi ennum by pabanasamsivan

Film Songs

Language:Tamil

Related ragas
This section covers the theoretical and scientific aspect of this raga.

Scale similarities
Lalitha is a popular raga that sounds very similar to Vasantha. Lalitha uses shuddha rishabham in ārohaṇa also, while the shuddha dhaivatam is used in it, compared to chatusruti dhaivatam in Vasantha.

Notes

References

Janya ragas